"U Got It Bad" is a song by American singer Usher, released through Arista Records as the second official single from his third studio album 8701 (2001). It was written by the rapper/producer Jermaine Dupri and Bryan-Michael Cox, and co-produced by Cox. It was released in the United States on August 21, 2001. "U Got It Bad" is an R&B ballad that, according to MTV, incorporates "digi-coustic" guitars, a "slow-burning bass line" and "sex funk" drums. The lyrics notably contain some quick direct allusions to other soul music ballads, mainly Maxwell's "Fortunate" and Prince's "Adore".

"U Got It Bad" topped the US Billboard Hot 100 for one week before being replaced for four weeks by Nickelback's "How You Remind Me". "U Got It Bad" then returned to number one, going on to stay atop for five consecutive weeks. With the song and previous single "U Remind Me", Usher was the only solo male act to have a number-one hit on the Hot 100 in 2001. The accompanying music video features TLC's Chilli as Usher's love interest.

Background and writing

"U Got It Bad" was written by Usher, Jermaine Dupri and Bryan-Michael Cox. It was produced by the former and co-produced by the latter. Recording was done by Brian Frye and mixing by Dupri and Phil Tan, at Southside Studios, Atlanta, Georgia in 2000. John Horesco IV provided mixing assistance, William "Billy" Odum performed the Guitar and Usher provided all vocals. The lyrics to the song were, according to Dupri, inspired by a true story. He and Usher were in the studio trying to record some music for the album, but Usher was continually distracted by a girl he had brought into the studio. Following an argument, the girl left. A while later, they started on talking on the phone, which prompted Dupri to kick Usher out of the studio telling him, “We’re going to do this [session] later on. You got it completely too bad right now. You got it bad.” This ignited the inspiration for the song, and once Usher had left, Dupri started writing its lyrics, with the notion that it was going to be a big hit. Once Usher had returned to the studio, Dupri shared the story of the song with him. Talking to Complex, Dupri stated that "U Got It Bad" is another "Nice & Slow", saying that he produced the song as he wanted to re-produce a track similar to the latter in terms of success, for Usher's 8701 (2001).

Composition and release
"U Got It Bad" is an R&B ballad. According to the sheet music published at Musicnotes.com by Sony/ATV Music Publishing, it is written in the key of B minor and has a metronome of 66 beats per minute. Usher's vocal range spans from the low note of F4 to the high note of A5. The song is actually a semitone lower in the key of Bb minor, which would have the vocals span from F4 to Ab5. "U Got It Bad" is a slow jam, that makes use of "digi-coustic" guitars, a "slow-burning bass line" and "sex funk" drums. Usher's vocals "floats and runs" between the song's melody's, before intensifying when entering the chorus.

The Neptunes produced track, "I Don’t Know," was initially intended as the album's second single. Rapper P. Diddy was to direct its music video in Los Angeles in July 2001. The song was receiving radio play prior to the release of 8701 first single "U Remind Me". However, Usher instead released "U Got It Bad" as the album's second single, as it presents his own unique sound, "If you wanna know what a Usher record is, then ["U Got It Bad" is] it," while using both Michael Jackson and Bobby Brown as examples of artists who "solidified" their music through their own unique music. "U Got it Bad" was released as a CD single in the US on December 18, 2001.

Reception
"U Got It Bad" won the 2002 Teen Choice Love Song award. In 2003, the song won an ASCAP Award for Publisher of the Year.

In 2016, Complex ranked the song number eight on their list of the 25 greatest Usher songs, and in 2021, American Songwriter ranked the song number five on their list of the 10 greatest Usher songs.

Chart performance
"U Got It Bad" topped the US Billboard Hot 100 chart on the week of December 15, 2001, becoming Usher's third number-one song on the chart. It was his second Hot 100 number one from 8701 after "U Remind Me", which reached the position in July of the same year. "U Got It Bad" marked the first time he obtained two consecutive number one hits. In December 2001, Usher became one of the few Arista acts to have more than one Hot 100 number one hit, with Whitney Houston having eleven, Barry Manilow and Milli Vanilli with three, and Monica with two. "U Got It Bad" was also atop the Hot 100 Airplay chart that week, with an audience impression of 135 million. The following week, the song was replaced by Nickelback's "How You Remind Me", moving it to number two. Nickelback's single remained number one for four consecutive weeks, before being replaced by "U Got It Bad" on the week of January 8, 2002, which went on to top the Hot 100 for five weeks. On the same week, the song broke the record for the highest audience impression on the Hot 100 Airplay chart, previously held by Alicia Keys, with 149,858,700 listeners. The song's popularity helped 8701 rise from number twenty-three to eight on the US Billboard 200 on the week of October 11, 2001.

Music video

A music video for "U Got It Bad" was directed by Canadian filmmaker Little X. Co-starring TLC member Rozonda "Chilli" Thomas as the female lead, the video starts with Usher tossing and turning in bed, troubled by the thought of his ex-girlfriend (Thomas). After awakening, he turns on the TV, only to see his ex, a celebrity on her own, on every station. The video proceeds to introduce flashbacks of happier times between the two, suggesting that he still longs for his ex. In his desperation to find her, he braves the rain, bursting into her trailer to apologize to and reconcile with her. However, this is revealed to be his imagination, and instead of opening the door of the trailer, he walks away ashamed. Disgusted, he makes his way home and lies in his bed, alone.

At the 2002 MTV Video Music Awards, the video was nominated for Best Male Video and Best R&B Video.

Track listing
CD single
 "U Got It Bad" (Radio Mix)
 "U Got It Bad" (Tee's Latin Remix)
 "U Got It Bad" (Soulpower Remix)
 "U Got It Bad" (Tee's Inhouse Club Remix)
 "U Got It Bad" (Tee's Dub)
 "U Got It Bad" (CD-Rom Video)

Charts

Weekly charts

Year-end charts

Decade-end charts

All-time chart

Certifications and sales

Release history

See also
 List of Billboard Hot 100 number-one singles of 2001
 List of number-one R&B singles of 2001 (U.S.)

References

Billboard Hot 100 number-one singles
2001 singles
2002 singles
Usher (musician) songs
Music videos directed by Director X
Contemporary R&B ballads
Song recordings produced by Jermaine Dupri
Songs written by Bryan-Michael Cox
Songs written by Jermaine Dupri
2001 songs
Arista Records singles
LaFace Records singles
Songs about heartache
2000s ballads